Lilla Brignone (23 August 1913 – 24 March 1984) was an Italian film and theater actress. She appeared in 40 films between 1930 and 1982. Her father was film director and actor Guido Brignone and her aunt was actress Mercedes Brignone. Her mother was actress Lola Visconti (pseudonym of Dolores Visconti).

Selected filmography
 Loyalty of Love (1934)
 Thirty Seconds of Love (1936)
 The Amnesiac (1936)
 The Jester's Supper (1942)
 Abbiamo vinto! (1951)
 Angels of Darkness (1954)
 Dreams in a Drawer (1957)
 Estate Violenta (1959)
 Ghosts of Rome (1961)
 L'Eclisse (1962)
 The Betrothed (1964)
 Malicious (1973)

References

External links

Lilla Brignone

1913 births
1984 deaths
Italian film actresses
Actresses from Rome
Deaths from cancer in Lazio
20th-century Italian actresses